The slender-billed weaver (Ploceus pelzelni) is a species of bird in the weaver family, Ploceidae.
It is found in central and western Africa.

Gallery

References

External links
 Slender-billed Weaver (Ploceus pelzelni) videos at the Internet Bird Collection
 Slender-billed weaver -  Species text in Weaver Watch.

slender-billed weaver
Birds of Central Africa
Birds of Sub-Saharan Africa
slender-billed weaver
Taxonomy articles created by Polbot